Albury Racecourse is a closed railway station on the Main South railway line located in New South Wales, Australia. The station opened in 1881 and closed in 1962. The station consisted of a single platform, and little remains of it today.

References

Disused regional railway stations in New South Wales
Railway stations in Australia opened in 1881
Railway stations closed in 1962
Main Southern railway line, New South Wales
Albury, New South Wales